Prana Krushna Parija OBE (1 April 1891 – 2 June 1978; born in Jagatsinghpur district) was an Indian botanist. His research work comprised mainly fundamental and applied aspects of plant physiology, experimental plant morphology, and ecological studies of plant environment. He studied water hyacinth and other aquatic weeds, respiration in leaves and apples, transpiration and heat resistance in plants, rice and algae and storage of apples. 

He served as a vice chancellor of Utkal University.
He worked as a principal in Ravenshaw University (formerly Ravenshaw College), CuttackPro Vice-Chancellor of Banaras Hindu University, Varanasi
and Vice-Chancellor of Utkal University, Bhubaneswar.
The "Parija Library" of the university is named after him.
He was President of the Indian Science Congress Association in 1960. He was an elected member of the first Odisha Legislative Assembly.

Awards and recognitions 
 Fearnsides Scholarship (1918), Christ's College, Cambridge, a scholarship to encourage clinical research in the field of organic diseases of the nervous system.
Officer of the Order of the British Empire (OBE), 1944 New Year Honours
 Padma Bhushan, 1955

References

External links
 Odisha Review (Jan 2012): Dr. Pranakrushna Parija
 Parijā, OCLC WorldCat Identities: Prāṇakr̥shṇa 1891-1978

1891 births
1978 deaths
People from Jagatsinghpur district
Odia scientists
20th-century Indian botanists
Recipients of the Padma Bhushan in literature & education
Officers of the Order of the British Empire
Ravenshaw University alumni
Alumni of Trinity College, Cambridge